The Colonial Valley Conference (CVC) is an athletic conference in Central Jersey composed of high schools located primarily in Mercer County, New Jersey, with one member school in Monmouth County (Allentown High School) and one in Middlesex County (West Windsor-Plainsboro High School North). The conference operates under the supervision of the New Jersey State Interscholastic Athletic Association (NJSIAA).

Allentown High School Redbirds
Ewing High School Blue Devils
Steinert High School (Hamilton East) Spartans
Nottingham High School (Hamilton North) Northstars
Hamilton High School (Hamilton West) Hornets
Hightstown High School Rams
Hopewell Valley Central High School Bulldogs
Lawrence High School Cardinals
Notre Dame High School Irish
Princeton High School Tigers
Robbinsville High School Ravens
Trenton Central High School Tornadoes
West Windsor-Plainsboro High School North Knights (Plainsboro)
West Windsor-Plainsboro High School South Pirates (West Windsor)

External links
 official website

 

New Jersey high school athletic conferences